Marcel Martí (1925–2010) was an Argentine-born sculptor of Catalan descent.

Life and work 
At the age of three, he returned with his parents to Spain, where the family became  established in Barcelona. His father was imprisoned during the Spanish Civil War for activities related to his membership in Acció Catòlica. Martí began to draw by the age of 17, and became interested in sculpture in 1946. 

In 1948 he had his first exhibition in Barcelona. By 1953, he devoted himself almost entirely to sculpture. His works have been displayed at exhibitions and museums throughout the Americas, as well as in Spain.  

Following a figurative period, most of his work after 1958 tended to the abstract. Martí died at the age of 85 on August 11, 2010, in Catalonia.

References

External links
Review of an installation in Barcelona
Biography of Marcel Martí
 Review of an installation in Madrid
 Biography from Galeria Barcelona
 Review of a sculpture in Santa Cruz de Tenerife
 Notice of death in El Punt

1925 births
Sculptors from Catalonia
Argentine sculptors
Argentine male artists
Male sculptors
Spanish male sculptors
Argentine people of Spanish descent
2010 deaths
Argentine emigrants to Spain